is a Japanese football player.

Club career
He was released by Nagoya Grampus after five seasons with the club.

Club statistics
Updated to 23 February 2018.

References

External links

Profile at Kataller Toyama

1993 births
Living people
Association football people from Aichi Prefecture
Japanese footballers
J1 League players
J2 League players
J3 League players
Nagoya Grampus players
Mito HollyHock players
J.League U-22 Selection players
Kataller Toyama players
Association football defenders